Allopeas, common name the "awl snails", is a genus of small, tropical, air-breathing land snails, terrestrial pulmonate gastropod mollusks in the family Achatinidae.

Species 
The genus Allopeas includes the following species:
 Allopeas clavulinum (Potiez & Michaud, 1838) - spike awlsnail
 Allopeas gracile (Hutton, 1834) - graceful awlsnail - type species
 Allopeas mauritianum (Pfeiffer, 1852) - Mauritian awlsnail
 Allopeas micra (d’Orbigny, 1835)
 Allopeas myrmekophilos R. Janssen, 2002

References

External links

Subulininae